The 1903 United States Senate election in Pennsylvania was held on January 20, 1903. Boies Penrose was re-elected by the Pennsylvania General Assembly to the United States Senate.

Results
The Pennsylvania General Assembly, consisting of the House of Representatives and the Senate, convened on January 20, 1903, to elect a Senator to fill the term beginning on March 4, 1903. Incumbent Republican Boies Penrose, who was elected in 1897, was a successful candidate for re-election to another term. The results of the vote of both houses combined are as follows:

|-
|-bgcolor="#EEEEEE"
| colspan="3" align="right" | Totals
| align="right" | 254
| align="right" | 100.00%
|}

See also 

 United States Senate elections, 1902 and 1903

References

External links
Pennsylvania Election Statistics: 1682-2006 from the Wilkes University Election Statistics Project

1903
Pennsylvania
United States Senate